Sox most often refers to:
 Boston Red Sox, an MLB team
 Chicago White Sox, an MLB team
 An alternate spelling of socks

Sox may also refer to:

Places
 SOX, Sogamoso Airport's IATA airport code, an airport in Colombia

Computing and technology
 SOX (operating system), a UNIX clone developed in Brazil in 1980s
 SoX or Sound eXchange, a computer program for audio manipulation
 Schema for Object-Oriented XML, an XML schema language
 Singapore Open Exchange, or SOX
 Simple Outline XML, an alternative XML syntax

Finance and law
 PHLX Semiconductor Sector, a widely used stock market index
 Sarbanes–Oxley Act of 2002, a United States federal securities law

Sports and related topics
 Black Sox Scandal, a 1919 baseball match fixing incident
 Bowie Baysox, a US minor league baseball team
 Bristol White Sox, a US minor league baseball team
 Butler BlueSox, playing in the Prospect League
 Colorado Springs Sky Sox, a US minor league baseball team
 Colorado Springs Sky Sox (Western League), a defunct American minor league baseball team
 Everett AquaSox, a US American minor league baseball team
 Holyoke Blue Sox, a college-level team playing in the NECBL
 New Bedford Bay Sox, a college-level team playing in the NECBL
 Pawtucket Red Sox, a US minor league baseball team
 Salem Red Sox, a US minor league baseball team
 South Bend Blue Sox, a former girls' team 1943-1954
 Yarmouth–Dennis Red Sox, playing in the CCBL

Science
 Cancelled SOX experiment in neutrino physics, Borexino detector, Italy
 SOX gene family
 Several Sulfur oxides ( or SOx)

Other uses
 Sox, a 1995 pop group led by Samantha Fox
 SOX, a type of low-pressure Sodium-vapor lamp
 Sox, robotic feline character from the 2022 American 3D-animated film Lightyear

See also
 Socks (disambiguation)
 Black Sox (disambiguation)
 Blue Sox (disambiguation)
 Gold Sox (disambiguation)
 Green Sox (disambiguation)
 Grey Sox (disambiguation)
 Red Sox (disambiguation)
 Silver Sox (disambiguation)
 White Sox (disambiguation)